Tule Springs is one of the larger urban retreats in Las Vegas, Nevada, and the Las Vegas Valley.  It is a significant desert ecosystem consisting of a series of small lakes that formed an oasis in this area of the Mojave Desert.  Both the springs and the ranch are located within the Floyd Lamb Park at Tule Springs which is operated by the City of Las Vegas.

Tule Springs Ranch

Tule Springs Ranch and the associated buildings are listed as a district on the United States National Register of Historic Places and located within this area. The ranch district was listed on the National Register of Historic Places on September 23, 1981.

Tule Springs Archaeological Site 

The area was home to numerous Native American visitors in the pre-Columbian period. More recently, it served as a guest ranch for out-of-state residents seeking to "live" in Nevada and gain access to its easy divorce requirements. Several of the ranch's buildings remain, as do a few peacocks.

The springs archeological site was listed on the National Register of Historic Places on April 20, 1979.

Tule Springs Wash 
The wash, also known as the Upper Las Vegas Wash feeds into the Las Vegas Wash.  The wash area also includes several patches of the rare Las Vegas bear poppy.

This area is part of the proposed Ice Age Fossils State Park, a  conservation area and a proposed national park.  In 2014, congress designated the area as a national monument, naming it Tule Springs Fossil Beds National Monument.

References

External links 
Floyd Lamb State Park website
Tule Springs Ice Age Park

Oases of Nevada
Tourist attractions in the Las Vegas Valley
Bodies of water of Clark County, Nevada